Rebecca Alleway is an English set decorator. She was nominated at the 81st Academy Awards in the category of Best Art Direction for her work on the film The Duchess. She shared her nomination with art director Michael Carlin.

Selected filmography
 What a Girl Wants (2003)
 The Duchess (2008)
 The Eagle (2011)
 Salmon Fishing in the Yemen (2011)
 Cloud Atlas (2012)
 Tulip Fever (2015)
A United Kingdom (2016)
 Murder on the Orient Express (2017)

References

External links

Living people
Year of birth missing (living people)
Set decorators
Place of birth missing (living people)